North Springfield is the name of the following cities in the United States of America:

North Springfield, Missouri, now part of Springfield, Missouri
North Springfield, Oregon
North Springfield, Vermont, village in Springfield, Vermont
North Springfield, Virginia